Sergey Grigorev-Appolonov (born 5 February 1987), known professionally as Grey Wiese, is a German singer-songwriter and television personality. Leading singer of band #APPolonovGang. He is popular in Russia. Grey is the nephew of Andrei Grigorev-Appolonov (member of Ivanushki International). Grey lives in Baden-Baden, Germany.

Early life 
Wiese studied piano and attended a folk dance school as a child. He studied management and economics and had a career in exports before turning to music through encouragement from his friends. He started with covers of Sia, Sam Smith, Rihanna and others uploaded to YouTube. His career snowballed with covers. His first original track was "Who Are You" in 2017. In  2017 and 2018, Grey released five singles and an album titled #Beyourself.

In 2018, he released the single "You and Me" with Julia Grigoreva-Appolonova. A month later, they released a video, starring Aleksandra Kutsevol, 's civil wife. The video scored more than a million views on YouTube. The song hit the Russian iTunes chart for several weeks, rising to 4th place.

In September 2018, with Andrei Grigorev-Appolonov Jr., Sergey organized a musical band  #AppolonovGang. In November 2018 they released "Deja Vu" in Russian written by Giorgio Moroder and Sia.

Discography  
 2017
 Who are you
 Sick with a dream
 I set you free
 We are in love
 With heart on hold
 2018
 #beyourself
 You and me (Я и Ты) feat. Andrey Grigorev-Appolonov Jr.
 Begging hurts feat. Andrey Grigorev-Appolonov Jr.
 Likes and Brands (Лайки Бренды) feat. Andrey Grigorev-Appolonov Jr.(#AppolonovGang)
 Before and after(После и До) feat. Andrey Grigorev-Appolonov Jr.
 Deja Vu written by Giorgio Moroder and Sia (#AppolonovGang)
 Pain (Боль) (#AppolonovGang)
2019
Happy (Щастливые)  (#AppolonovGang) 
2020
Smotri (#APPolonovGang) Album

References

External links 
 Official website
 Instagram account
 Music Channel on Youtube

1987 births
Living people
German male singer-songwriters
German singer-songwriters
German television personalities
Musicians from Saratov
21st-century Russian male singers
21st-century Russian singers
People from Baden-Baden